A 45 rpm adapter (also 45 rpm record insert, 45 rpm spindle adapter, 7-inch adapter or spider, the common size of 45 RPM records) is a small plastic or metal insert that goes in the middle of a 45-rpm record so it can be played on the standard size spindle of a turntable. The adapter could be a small solid circle that fits onto the spindle (meaning only one 45 could be played at a time) or a larger adapter that fits over the entire spindle of a record changer, permitting a stack of 45s to be played. These are often referred to as 45 spindles. A few manufacturers supplied a complete change of spindle for 45s. 

The first 45 rpm inserts were introduced by the Webster-Chicago Corporation, also known as Webcor.  They were made of solid zinc, difficult to insert into a record and almost impossible to remove without breaking the disc.  A differently shaped, but similarly difficult-to-use metal adapter was made by Fidelitone.  Capitol Records for a time produced what they called "Optional Center" or "O.C. 45" records.  These had a triangular section molded in with an LP-size spindle hole that could be punched out for playing on 45 rpm spindles. Some EMI and other British records have a similar feature. The EMI version is circular, with four small notches holding the center part onto the rest of the record.

The Spider 
The former RCA Corporation introduced a snap-in plastic insert known as a spider  to make 45 rpm records compatible with the smaller spindle size of a  rpm LP record player.  Commissioned by RCA president David Sarnoff and invented by Thomas Hutchison, spiders were prevalent in the 1960s and sold tens of millions per year.  The Hutchison adapter included small bumps called "drive pins," which locked the adapters together while revolving, thus preventing the stacked records from slipping against each other.  Several manufacturers made "spider" adapters in slightly varying shapes and many different colors, though yellow and red were most frequently used.

The SX2 
The SX2 and The Extender were designed and manufactured by Mark McLaughlan between the early 1980s and early 1990s.  McLaughlan, a Boston area nightclub DJ, came up with the design to make 7" discs easier to handle when mixing.  The original design (The Extender) was made up of a platter die-cut from sheets of plastic that McLaughlan would drive on the hood of his car from the supplier in Cambridge, MA to the die-cutter in Ipswich, MA.  He would then do the final assembly (bonding a lathe cut acrylic center and a foam pad) and packaging by hand.  The SX2 (Single Extender, Rev 2) was manufactured by plastic injection at Spirit, Inc. in Wakefield, Massachusetts.  One of the main design revisions, required was a series of 'ribs' on the underside of the platter to prevent warping from the extreme changes in temperature during the manufacturing process.  A raised barrier was also added to contain the head in the event of miscuing and a polished surface inside the barrier to minimize damage to the stylus.  Due to its limited manufacturing run the SX2 has become a sought after rarity among pro DJs.

Gallery

References

Recorded music